K2-315b is an exoplanet located 185.3 light years away from Earth in the southern zodiac constellation Libra. It orbits the red dwarf K2-315.

Discovery 
K2-315b was discovered in 2020 by astronomers in an observatory using the Kepler space telescope. It is also nicknamed the "Pi Planet" because it takes approximately 3.14 days to orbit the host star.

Physical properties 
The planet is thought to be a small rocky planet, even though composition is unknown. Since it orbits very close to its star, it is too hot to host life, due to it having a scorching temperature of 450 K. Not much is known about it because it was just discovered, but it is similar to Earth, having a radius 95% that of Earth, very similar to Venus, but has 81% Earth's mass.

References 

Libra (constellation)
Exoplanets discovered in 2020
Exoplanets discovered by K2